Sobao or sobao pasiego is a Spanish delicacy typical of the Valles Pasiegos and one of the signature delicacies of Cantabria.
The sobao pasiego possesses Geographical indication since 2004.

Variations
In the first primitive recipes, the ingredients comprise simple bread dough, white sugar and butter. The ancient recipe of sobao pasiego also adds two eggs, lemon zest and anise liquor or rum.
The modern sobao was developed in 1896, when the personal cook of the famous doctor Enrique Diego-Madrazo (known as Madrazo), Eusebia Hernández Martín substituted the bread dough with flour.

Preparation
The recipe includes one kilo of sugar, one of butter, 900 grams of flour, 12 eggs, a pinch of salt, lemon zest, a spoon of rum or anise liquor and a bit of dry yeast. The butter and sugar are mixed together, then salt and lemon are added under continuous stirring. One by one the eggs are added with the spoonful of liquor and finally, flour and yeast are incorporated. As soon as all ingredients are thoroughly mixed the dough is ready, filled into a baking dish and baked in the oven.

See also
Cantabrian cuisine

External links
Information and recipe for Sobao pasiego
Recipe for Sobao pasiego

References

Spanish desserts
Cantabrian cuisine
Baked goods